Polymerase I and transcript release factor, also known as Cavin1, Cavin-1 or PTRF, is a protein which in humans is encoded by the PTRF gene.

Function 
PTRF (Cavin1) has been shown to be crucial for caveola formation and function. 

Termination of RNA polymerase I catalyzed transcription is a 2-step process that involves pausing of transcription elongation and release of both the pre-ribosomal RNA and Pol I from the DNA template. The pausing is mediated by TTF1 and PTRF.

PTRF is a soluble protein containing putative leucine zipper, nuclear localization signal, and PEST domains.

Interactions 

PTRF (Cavin1) forms trimers with Cavin2 and Cavin3 in caveola formation and has been shown to interact with other membrane associating proteins such as EHD2 and caveolins. 

PTRF has been shown to interact with ZNF148.

References

Further reading